Nat King Cole at the Piano is the first studio album by jazz pianist Nat King Cole, released by Capitol in 1950.

This album was recorded on August 13, 1947, released in a 78 r.p.m. record in 1949, and reissued in 1950 on a 10-inch LP.

Track listing 
 "Three Little Words" (Bert Kalmar, Harry Ruby) – 2:39
 "Moonlight In Vermont" (John Blackburn, Karl Suessdorf) – 3:13
 "Poor Butterfly" (Raymond Hubbell) – 2:34
 "How High the Moon" (Nancy Hamilton, Morgan Lewis) – 2:41
 "I'll Never Be The Same" (Matty Malneck, Frank Signorelli) – 2:50
 "These Foolish Things (Remind Me of You)" (Holt Marvell, Strachey, Harry Link) – 3:14
 "Cole Capers" (Nat King Cole) – 1:56
 "Blues In My Shower" (Cole) – 2:53

Personnel 
Nat King Cole – piano, arranger
Oscar Moore – guitar
Johnny Miller – double bass

References
Nat King Cole at the Piano (Capitol H-156, Capitol CC-135, Capitol EBF-156, Capitol CCN-156) at: 
apileocole...com ("A Pile o' Cole" Nat King Cole web site)
bsnpubs.com ("Both Sides Now" discography web site)

Nat King Cole albums
Capitol Records albums
1950 albums